4 VIP האח הגדול (HaAh HaGadol VIP 4 ; lit. The Big Brother VIP 4) is the fourth VIP season of the Israeli version of the Big Brother series.

Housemates

Nominations table

Notes 

: As part of a secret mission, the last two housemates to enter the house, Oren and Dana, had to choose four housemates who connected the least. They chose Eyal, Maya, Romi and Roel, and as one of the consequences, the four chosen housemates entered the first eviction list of the season.
: After only a week after Jackie entered the house and only two days after the premiere of this season, he decided to leave the house due to personal reasons.

Nominations totals received

References

External links 
Official website 

VIP 04
Israel 04
2021 Israeli television seasons